Muntenii de Jos is a commune in Vaslui County, Western Moldavia, Romania. It is composed of four villages: Băcăoani, Mânjești, Muntenii de Jos and Secuia.

References

Communes in Vaslui County
Localities in Western Moldavia